Sakh Selu (also Romanized as Sākh Selū, Sākhselū, Sakhasloo, Sākhaslū, and Sākheslū; also known as Sakhseli, Sākheşlī, and Sākhsūlī) is a village in Bedevostan-e Gharbi Rural District, Khvajeh District, Heris County, East Azerbaijan Province, Iran. At the 2006 census, its population was 128, in 33 families.

References 

Populated places in Heris County